S.A. Cycles Eddy Merckx Rijwielen N.V., better known as Eddy Merckx, is a Belgian brand of high end road bikes, founded by former professional road cyclist Eddy Merckx in 1980. It is considered to be one of the most prestigious bicycle brands in the world.

History 

Eddy Merckx, who is generally considered to be the greatest cyclist of all time, founded his eponymous bicycle company on March 28, 1980. Merckx had retired as a professional rider a little under two years earlier, and he made the manufacturing of high-end road bikes his new professional challenge.

Merckx got the idea to build bikes from Ugo De Rosa, who headed the Italian bike manufacturer De Rosa, and who had built bikes for Merckx throughout his career. Prior to starting his company, Merckx went to Italy, and got trained in the art of making bikes by De Rosa for several weeks. Conversely, Ugo De Rosa visited Eddy Merckx in Belgium to get to know his first employees.

Merckx built his factory in what were formerly farm stables in Meise, a small town in the outskirts of Brussels, and went to live in farm house nextdoors. Later, the company moved to the bordering municipality of Zellik, where it remains until today.

Among his first employees were some of his former Molteni teammates, the team with which he won three of his five Tour de France victories, three of his five Giro d'Italia victories, and two of his three World Championships.  Among these employees were Jos Huysmans, Edouard Janssens, and his former team manager, Bob Lelangue.  After Merckx’ teammates retired in the recent past, the company has continued the tradition to hire former professional riders to work for the company in the different roles.

At first, Merckx specialized in making steel frames, then the industry standard. Later on, he successfully switched over to aluminium and, briefly, titanium. Today, all but one of his bikes are made of carbon fiber, the lightest and stiffest material to make bikes. Eddy Merckx himself has resigned from company management and sold all his shares. The company was owned by Diepensteyn NV from 2014 until June 23, 2017, when Race Productions NV, the owner of Ridley, another Belgian cycle brand, announced the acquisition of Eddy Merckx Cycles.

Heritage 

Eddy Merckx’ name quickly became a synonym for one of the most prestigious brands in the cycling world, a reputation it keeps until today.

Merckx had always been obsessed with having the best possible bike for his rides. As a rider, he famously adjusted his saddle height during races, stopping over several times in crucial races such as Paris–Roubaix or the World Championships, to ensure he would be able to perform at his best. And even as manufacturers like Masi, Colnago and De Rosa built the bikes for him and his team, in the 1970s, they already carried Merckx' name due to his involvement in the design of the bikes. Ugo De Rosa said:

As a manufacturer, Merckx continued to spend a lot of efforts in the geometry, quality and safety of his bikes. Sam Dansie of Procycling wrote:

In 2008, after 28 years of leading the company, Merckx retired from his post as CEO, but continued to instruct his engineers and test the bikes that carried his name:

Nowadays, Eddy Merckx engineers are known for making bikes that are stable and reliable at speed. Following the advice from its founder, the company has decided to move away from a focus on only weight, focusing instead on stability of bike and rider:

The fact that Eddy Merckx founded the company still instills a sense of obligation among the company's engineers and mechanics, the company says:

Current line of bikes

EMX-525 
The Eddy Merckx EMX-525 (Merckx won a total of 525 races in his career) is the company's flagship road bike. It is marketed under the slogan the best balanced bike in the world. Specialists have reviewed it as one of the fastest and most responsive bikes in the world, praising it for its stability, power, and speed.

Main characteristics 

The bike has an asymmetrical design, which means the left hand side has a different design and weight distribution than the right hand side. This allows for a better stability of the bike, as the gear system is installed on only one side and needs to be counterbalanced in terms of weight and power.

The bike has a higher frame stiffness than other bikes on the market, and incorporates all parts of the bottom bracket inside the frame. This allows for a superior power transmission when the rider puts power in the pedals; all the power a rider puts into the bike goes into the forward movement.

Finally, the bike has an oversized and stiff head tube in which the front fork fits completely. This allows for easier turning in corners and on downhills, and is supposed to give the rider more confidence at speed.

With the help of Eddy Merckx, the company's head engineer Dave Luyckx said he wanted to build the ultimate racing machine with the currently available technology. About the result, he wrote:

Reviews 

Bicycling Magazine placed the EMX-525 on the cover of its 2013 buyer's guide and called it uncompromising and very fast. It wrote:

Cycling Weekly of the UK wrote

Road CC of the UK said:

Other current models

EMX-3 
The EMX-3 is Eddy Merckx' Gran Fondo style bike. It has a more relaxed geometry than the EMX-525 to allow for longer, more comfortable rides. It comes with either electronic or mechanical shifting, in Shimano or  Campagnolo.

ETT 

The ETT is Eddy Merckx' Time Trial and Triathlon bike. It is used by the professional Topsport Vlaanderen–Baloise team in time trials.

EMX-1 

The EMX-1 is Eddy Merckx' entry level bike.

AMX-1 

The AMX-1 is Eddy Merckx' aluminium bike. It is custom-built in Belgium on demand.

Sponsorship 

As from its first year, Eddy Merckx bikes were used by professional riders, a tradition that continues to date. Some of the best professional cycling teams in the 1980s and 1990s rode them.

The Marc – V.R.D. team of manager Patrick Lefevere rode Eddy Merckx bikes a mere three months after the company was created, and immediately won two le Tour de France stages. Later, teams like Panasonic, Kelme, 7 Eleven, Telekom, Motorola and Quickstep used Eddy Merckx bikes. Hundreds of professional riders, including former Tour de France winners like Jan Ullrich, green jersey winners like Erik Vanderaerden, Erik Zabel, Robbie McEwen and Tom Boonen and American professionals like Frankie Andreu, Lance Armstrong, Steve Bauer and George Hincapie rode an Eddy Merckx bike at some point in their career. Today, Eddy Merckx still sponsors three pro cycling teams, including Topsport Vlaanderen–Baloise, a Belgian team for promising young professional cyclists.

About the lasting presence of Eddy Merckx in the peloton, Procycling journalist Sam Dansie wrote:

In 2019 Eddy Merckx bikes will return to le Tour de France with team AG2R La Mondiale.

Assembly and distribution 

Eddy Merckx bikes are assembled in Belgium, and sold through a dealer network in Europe and other export markets. In the US the bikes are also for sale via the company's website.

References

External links 

 

Vehicle manufacturing companies established in 1980
1980 establishments in Belgium
Cycle manufacturers of Belgium
Belgian brands
Eddy Merckx
Companies based in Flemish Brabant
Belgian companies established in 1980